H.O.C. Gazellen-Combinatie, also known as HGC, is a Dutch field hockey club located in Wassenaar, South Holland on the border of The Hague. The club was founded on 22 September 1906.

The first teams (men and women) competed for many years on the highest level of the Dutch field hockey league, in the "Hoofdklasse". In 1995/'96 both the men's and the women's first team won the national championship. The men's 1st XI also competed in the Euro Hockey League.

HGC has produced a number of internationals for the Dutch national teams as well as attracting a number of internationals from other countries.

Honours

Men
Hoofdklasse
 Winners (2): 1989–90, 1995–96
 Runners-up (10): 1970–71, 1977–78, 1978–79, 1980–81, 1986–87, 1987–88, 1990–91, 1992–93, 2006–07, 2009–10
Euro Hockey League
 Winners (1): 2010–11
 Runners-up (1): 2007–08
European Cup
 Winners (1): 1997
Cup Winners' Cup
 Winners (2): 1992, 1993
 Runners-up (1): 1994
Hoofdklasse Indoor
 Winners (4): 1985–86, 1992–93, 1995–96, 1997–98

Women
Hoofdklasse
 Winners (8): 1981–82, 1984–85, 1985–86, 1987–88, 1989–90, 1992–93, 1995–96, 1996–97
 Runners-up (6): 1982–83, 1986–87, 1988–89, 1990–91, 1991–92, 1994–95
KNHB Cup
 Winners (1): 1996
European Cup
 Winners (7): 1983, 1984, 1985, 1986, 1987, 1991, 1994
 Runners-up (1): 1997
Cup Winners' Cup
 Winners (1): 1993
Hoofdklasse Indoor
 Winners (6): 1981–82, 1983–84, 1985–86, 1986–87, 2002–03, 2003–04

Players

Current squad

Men's squad
Head coach: Paul van Ass

Women's squad
Head coach: Robbert-Jan de Vos

Notable players

Men's internationals

/

 John Jermyn
 Iain Lewers
 Eugene Magee

 Phil Burrows 
 Shea McAleese

 Tanguy Cosyns

 Kenta Tanaka

Women's internationals

 

 Lizzie Colvin

References

External links

 
Dutch field hockey clubs
Field hockey clubs established in 1906
1906 establishments in the Netherlands
Sport in Wassenaar
Sports clubs in South Holland